Lauren Kalvaria (born August 29, 1980) is an American former professional tennis player.

A right-handed player from Florida, Kalvaria competed professionally after graduating from Stanford University in 2002. 

While at Stanford she and Gabriela Lastra became the top ranked doubles pairing in college tennis, which culminated in them the winning 2002 NCAA doubles championship. 

Kalvaria featured mostly in satellite tournaments on the professional tour and reached a career high singles ranking of 323 in the world. As a doubles player she won three ITF titles and appeared, with Lastra, in the main draw of the 2002 US Open.

ITF finals

Singles: 2 (0–2)

Doubles: 6 (3–3)

References

External links
 
 

1980 births
Living people
American female tennis players
Stanford Cardinal women's tennis players
Tennis people from Florida